Wu Lanying (born 26 October 1955) is a Chinese sport shooter who competed in the 1984 Summer Olympics and in the 1988 Summer Olympics.

References

1955 births
Living people
Chinese male sport shooters
Skeet shooters
Olympic shooters of China
Shooters at the 1984 Summer Olympics
Shooters at the 1988 Summer Olympics
Shooters at the 1978 Asian Games
Shooters at the 1990 Asian Games
Asian Games medalists in shooting
Asian Games gold medalists for China
Asian Games bronze medalists for China
Medalists at the 1978 Asian Games
Medalists at the 1990 Asian Games
20th-century Chinese people